Customary international law is an aspect of international law involving the principle of custom. Along with general principles of law and treaties, custom is considered by the International Court of Justice, jurists, the United Nations, and its member states to be among the primary sources of international law.  

Many governments accept in principle the existence of customary international law, although there are differing opinions as to what rules are contained in it. Customary international law has two elements: sufficient state practice and opinio juris.

In 1950, the International Law Commission listed the following sources as forms of evidence of customary international law: treaties, decisions of national and international courts, national legislation, opinions of national legal advisors, diplomatic correspondence, and practice of international organizations. In 2018, the Commission adopted Conclusions on Identification of Customary International Law with commentaries. The United Nations General Assembly welcomed the Conclusions and encouraged their widest possible dissemination.

Recognition of customary international law

The International Court of Justice Statute defines customary international law in Article 38(1)(b) as "a general practice accepted as law". This is generally determined through two factors: the general practice of states and what states have accepted as law (opinio juris sive necessitatis). This means that many states need to engage in the practice (in particular, great powers) and that states engage in the practice out of a sense of legal obligation (rather than custom or habit).

There are several kinds of customary international laws recognized by states. Some customary international laws rise to the level of jus cogens through acceptance by the international community as non-derogable  rights, while other customary international law may simply be followed by a small group of states. States are typically bound by customary international law regardless of whether the states have codified these laws domestically or through treaties.

Jus cogens

A peremptory norm (also called jus cogens, Latin for "compelling law") is a fundamental principle of international law which is accepted by the international community of states as a norm from which no derogation is ever permitted (non-derogable). These norms are rooted in natural law principles, and any laws conflicting with it should be considered null and void. Examples include various international crimes; a state violates customary international law if it permits or engages in slavery, torture, genocide, war of aggression, or crimes against humanity.

Jus cogens and customary international law are not interchangeable. All jus cogens are customary international law through their adoption by states, but not all customary international laws rise to the level of peremptory norms. States can deviate from customary international law by enacting treaties and conflicting laws, but jus cogens are non-derogable.

Codification of international customary law 

Some international customary laws have been codified through treaties and domestic laws, while others are recognized only as customary law.

The laws of war, also known as jus in bello, were long a matter of customary law before they were codified in the Hague Conventions of 1899 and 1907, Geneva Conventions, and other treaties. However, these conventions do not purport to govern all legal matters that may arise during war. Instead, Article 1(2) of Additional Protocol I dictates that customary international law governs legal matters concerning armed conflict not covered by other agreements.

Silence as consent

Generally, sovereign nations must consent in order to be bound by a particular treaty or legal norm. However, international customary laws are norms that have become pervasive enough internationally that countries need not consent in order to be bound. In these cases, all that is needed is that the state has not objected to the law. However, states that object to customary international law may not be bound by them unless these laws are deemed to be jus cogens.  However, in a dispute with any nation that has not affirmed the "silence implies consent" principle, any invocation of the "silence implies consent" principle involves an appeal to custom, such that if that nation does not espouse the broader premise of acknowledging the existence of customary international law, such an appeal will depend on circular reasoning ("customary international law is binding because silence implies consent, and silence implies consent because the fact that silence implies consent is one aspect of customary international law").

The International Court of Justice

The Statute of the International Court of Justice acknowledges the existence of customary international law in Article 38(1)(b), incorporated into the United Nations Charter by Article 92: "The Court, whose function is to decide in accordance with international law such as disputes that are submitted to it, shall apply ... international custom, as evidence of a general practice accepted as law."

Article 38(1) (b) of the Statute of International Court of Justice, has recognized International Custom as evidence of general practice accepted as law. Thus, general practice demonstrates custom, and not vice versa. In order to prove the existence of customary rule it is necessary to show that there exists a ‘general practice’ which conforms to the rule and which is accepted as law.

Customary international law "consists of rules of law derived from the consistent conduct of States acting out of the belief that the law required them to act that way". It follows that customary international law can be discerned by a "widespread repetition by States of similar international acts over time (state practice); Acts must occur out of sense of obligation (opinio juris); Acts must be taken by a significant number of States and not be rejected by a significant number of States." A marker of customary international law is consensus among states exhibited both by widespread conduct and a discernible sense of obligation.

The two essential elements of customary international law are state practice and opinio juris, as confirmed by the International Court of Justice in the Legality of the Threat or Use of Nuclear Weapons.

In relation to the psychological element that is opinio juris, the International Court of Justice further held in North Sea Continental Shelf, that "not only must the acts concerned amount to a settle practice, but they must also be such, or be carried out in such a way, as to be evidence of a belief that this practice is rendered obligatory by the existence of a rule of law requiring it ... The States concerned must therefore feel that they are conforming to what amounts to a legal obligation." The Court emphasised the need to prove a "sense of legal duty" as distinct from "acts motivated by considerations of courtesy, convenience or tradition". This was subsequently confirmed in Nicaragua v. United States of America.

Bilateral versus multilateral customary international law

The recognition of different customary laws can range from simple bilateral recognition of customary laws to worldwide multilateral recognition. Regional customs can become customary international law in their respective regions, but do not become customary international law for nations outside the region. The existence of bilateral customary law was recognized by the International Court of Justice in the Right of Passage Over Indian Territory case between Portugal and India, in which the court found "no reason why long continued practice between the two states accepted by them as regulating their relations should not form the basis of mutual rights and obligations between the two states".

Other customary international laws

Other examples accepted or claimed as customary international law include immunity of visiting foreign heads of state and the principle of non-refoulement. United Nations Security Council in 1993 adopted Geneva conventions as customary international law because since the time being it has transformed itself into customary international law. If any treaty or law has been called as customary international law then parties which have not ratified said treaty will be bound to observe its provisions in good faith.

See also 

Customary international humanitarian law
Customary law
Crimes against humanity
Genocide
Human rights
Public international law
International humanitarian law
International human rights law
International regulation
Refugee law
Rule of law
Rule according to higher law
Soft law
Vienna Convention on the Law of Treaties

References

Bibliography
Customary International Law,  Max Planck Encyclopedia of Public International Law
Customary international humanitarian law International Committee of the Red Cross
A Brief Primer on International Law With cases and commentary.  Nathaniel Burney, 2007.
 Customary International Law - Bibliographies on the topics of the International Law Commission (no.13 in the list) (UNOG Library)

External links
 Customary IHL Database
 Peace Palace Library - Research Guide

International law
Custom